Aubrey Kerr McClendon (July 14, 1959 – March 2, 2016) was an American businessman and the founder and chief executive officer of American Energy Partners, LP. He also co-founded Chesapeake Energy, serving as its CEO and chairman. He was an outspoken advocate for natural gas as an alternative to oil and coal fuels, and a pioneer in employing fracking. 

McClendon was a part-owner of the National Basketball Association (NBA)'s Oklahoma City Thunder franchise, and was part of the ownership group that moved the Seattle SuperSonics to Oklahoma City in 2008.

On March 1, 2016, McClendon was indicted by a federal grand jury on charges of conspiring "to rig bids for the purchase of oil and natural gas leases in northwest Oklahoma". He died the following day, March 2, 2016, in a single-vehicle collision.

Early life and education

McClendon was born July 14, 1959, in Oklahoma City, Oklahoma, the son of Carole Kerr and Joe Connor McClendon. He was the great-nephew of Robert S. Kerr, a governor of Oklahoma and U.S. senator from the state.

McClendon spent his childhood in Belle Isle, a neighborhood in Oklahoma City and attended Belle Isle Elementary School, a public school. He graduated from Heritage Hall School in 1977 as senior class president and co-valedictorian. As a teenager, McClendon started a lawn mowing business, through which he had an early encounter with Shannon Self, who later became a founding board member of Chesapeake Energy Corporation.

McClendon graduated from Duke in 1981 with a B.A. in history. His favorite area of study was the post-Civil War Reconstruction Era. McClendon minored in accounting and was a member of Sigma Alpha Epsilon fraternity. He also met his wife, the former Kathleen Upton Byrns, while at Duke.

McClendon's first job after Duke was as an accountant. He was inspired to move from accounting to the energy business after reading an article in The Wall Street Journal about two men selling their Anadarko Basin well stake for $100 million. McClendon worked as a landman at Jaytex Oil and Gas, a public company in Oklahoma City founded by his uncle, Aubrey M. Kerr, Jr. McClendon left Jaytex in November 1982 to pursue his own business in the oil and natural gas industry.

Business career

Chesapeake Energy Corporation

In 1983, McClendon and Tom L. Ward "threw in together" in their initial venture into oil and natural gas. Together, they co-founded Chesapeake Energy Corporation in 1989. McClendon and Ward were both 29 at the time. McClendon began as chairman and chief executive officer of Chesapeake, while Ward served as president and chief financial officer. The company began drilling its first two wells in Garvin County, Oklahoma, in May 1989.

With Chesapeake, McClendon focused on drilling wells into unconventional reservoirs such as fractured carbonates and shales and was an early adopter of horizontal drilling and hydraulic fracturing techniques, which helped accelerate the company's fast early growth. His focus on these new and unconventional techniques later led to him being called a "visionary leader" in the oil and natural gas industry.

He took the firm public in 1993, and in the following three years its stock was the most successful in the country, rising 274% in value from 1994 to 1997, according to The Wall Street Journal.

In 2005, Forbes Magazine named McClendon one of the country's top-performing executives for his role at Chesapeake. A few years later, he was the highest paid CEO of all the S&P 500 companies in 2008, receiving a compensation package totaling $112 million.

In 2008, McClendon was notified that his shares were no longer valuable enough to back a margin loan with Goldman Sachs and other banks. In response, McClendon was forced to sell a majority of his 31.5 million shares, comprising 94% of his stake in Chesapeake and 6% of the company. The following year, Chesapeake offered McClendon a five-year retention contract, including a $75 million bonus.

In 2011, Forbes called McClendon "America's most reckless billionaire" in a cover story on his career. The profile noted his high risk tolerance and cited the sale of his shares in 2008 as a reckless move. The same year, the magazine named McClendon to its 20-20 Club, comprising the eight CEOs of public companies who had delivered annualized returns of more than 20% over a 20-year period. McClendon dismissed those who described him as a risk-loving wildcatter. "If I wanted to always do the most popular thing, then I'd be a follower," he said in 2012. "The funny thing is that I don't consider myself a gambler at all. A gambler is somebody who just closes their eyes and rolls the dice. We don't do that".

Chesapeake continued to grow its gas production under McClendon from 5 million to 2.5 billion cubic feet per day from 2009 to 2013. Chesapeake's discovery of large reserves of natural gas was reported to have helped reduce natural gas prices to consumers in the U.S.

In a 2012 opinion piece discussing the development of the domestic oil and natural gas industry of the U.S. in the first decade of the 21st century, the former United States Secretary of Energy and Houston mayor Bill White described McClendon as "at the forefront of those heroes" of the American natural gas industry.

According to allegations reported in Reuters in April 2012, McClendon took out more than $1 billion in personal loans, to finance drilling costs, from firms that were lenders to Chesapeake. This raised the potential for conflicts of interest and prompted questions on the corporate governance and business ethics of Chesapeake's senior management.

On February 20, 2013, Dow Jones reported that a Chesapeake board review found no improper conduct, no improper benefit to McClendon and no increased cost to the company.

On June 7, 2012, Reuters alleged that McClendon had used Chesapeake employees to perform $3 million of personal work, including engineering and accounting support and the repair of his house, in 2010. He had also used corporate planes for non-business-related travel for the McClendons' family and friends. According to Chesapeake's proxy statement filed with the SEC on May 11, 2012, McClendon reimbursed the company for all but $250,000 of the employee costs. His employment agreement authorized the personal use of company aircraft by McClendon, his immediate family members and guests, "for safety, security and efficiency" reasons.

In June 2012, Chesapeake shareholders voted to reject two board members and approve increased proxy access. McClendon relinquished his chairman title in June 2012, remaining in his role as CEO. McClendon stepped down from his position as CEO at Chesapeake on April 1, 2013. At the time, the company was estimated to be the second largest producer of natural gas in the United States, following only ExxonMobil.

Since 1992, through an initiative called the Founder Well Participation Program (FWPP), McClendon was allowed to invest in wells drilled by Chesapeake. The FWPP was first formalized and incorporated into the founders' employment agreements in connection with Chesapeake's IPO in February 1993.

Following his departure from the company, McClendon retained the option to continue investing in Chesapeake wells through July 2014.

In February 2015, Chesapeake filed a lawsuit against McClendon, accusing him of misappropriating company data on available land during his departure. McClendon and American Energy Partners responded that he had the right to all information in his possession under his various separation agreements with Chesapeake. In April 2015, American Energy – Utica, LLC reached a settlement with Chesapeake, giving them  of land and $25 million. As of April 2015, McClendon had been in arbitration with Chesapeake regarding the lawsuit against him.

American Energy Partners, LP
On April 2, 2013, McClendon founded American Energy Partners, LP (AELP), a private oil and natural gas company based in Oklahoma City.

During 2013 and 2014, McClendon hired more than 600 employees and raised equity and debt commitments of approximately $15 billion. AELP is an oil and natural gas company comprising several affiliated companies, including American Energy Utica LLC and American Energy Marcellus LLC, American Energy – Permian Basin, LLC, American Energy – Woodford, LLC, American Energy – NonOp, LLC, American Energy – Minerals, LLC, and American Energy – Midstream, LLC.

Natural gas advocacy
McClendon was a founding member of America's Natural Gas Alliance (ANGA), a trade association and lobbying group for independent natural gas producers, based in Washington, D.C. He was an advocate for the greater use of natural gas in the United States and he funded a campaign in 2007 to draw clean-energy activists' attention to a Texas utility's plan to build 11 new coal plants. He also made a donation to the Sierra Club to fund its "Beyond Coal" campaign, which had blocked more than 150 new coal plants in the United States, as of October 2013.

McClendon was a public proponent of natural gas, fracking and shale drilling throughout his career. In an appearance on 60 Minutes in 2010, McClendon argued a case for natural gas as a clean fuel and a significant job-creating industry. He defended the natural gas and oil industry's use of hydraulic fracturing techniques for well completion. Later that year, he was quoted saying, "We have found something that can liberate us from the influence of OPEC, that can put several million Americans back to work, liberate us from four-dollar gasoline."

Federal indictment for violating antitrust laws
On March 1, 2016, a federal grand jury indicted McClendon for violating antitrust laws, with conspiring to suppress prices paid for oil and natural gas leases by allegedly rigging the bidding process. The indictment says he orchestrated a conspiracy in which two oil and gas companies colluded not to bid against each other for the purchase of leases in northwestern Oklahoma. The conspiracy he is suspected of was orchestrating a scheme between two large energy companies, which are not named in the indictment, that was conducted from December 2007 through March 2012. According to the indictment, the companies would decide ahead of time who would win bids, with the winner then allocating an interest in the leases to the other company, eliminating open competitive bidding with landowners. One of the unnamed companies in the indictment turned out to be SandRidge Energy, Inc. according to Bloomberg News. The United States Justice Department said this was the first case resulting from a continuing federal antitrust investigation into price fixing, bid rigging and other anticompetitive conduct in the oil and natural gas industry. In 2015, Chesapeake Energy settled charges of antitrust, fraud, and racketeering violations out of court, by agreeing to pay $25 million as compensation to landowners with leases.

After his indictment McClendon released a statement denying all charges, arguing that for 35 years he has worked to create jobs and help Oklahoma's economy while providing plentiful energy for the entire country. "The charge that has been filed against me today is wrong and unprecedented, I have been singled out as the only person in the oil and gas industry in over 110 years since the Sherman Act became law to have been accused of this crime in relation to joint bidding on leasehold." William Baer, then Assistant Attorney General of the United States Justice Department Antitrust Division in the Obama administration, said "His actions put company profits ahead of the interests of leaseholders entitled to competitive bids for oil and gas rights on their land. Executives who abuse their positions as leaders of major corporations to organize criminal activity must be held accountable for their actions."

McClendon maintained his innocence, but died the next day, March 2, 2016, in a single-occupant single-vehicle crash when he drove his SUV at 88 mph into a concrete bridge embankment.

Business ventures and investments
McClendon held a stake in various food service companies and restaurants, including Jamba Juice. He also held stakes in several Oklahoma City restaurants, including Irma's Burger Shack, Deep Fork Grill, The Coach House, Republic Gastro Pub, Metro Wine Bistro & Bar, Provision Kitchen and Pops. McClendon opened Pops, a burgers and soda restaurant on the historic Route 66 highway in Arcadia, Oklahoma, in 2007.

From 2004 to 2008, McClendon ran a $200 million hedge fund, Heritage Management Company LLC, with Tom Ward. He invested $35 million in ProCure Treatment Centers Inc., a company with three proton-therapy based cancer treatment centers, in 2008.

From 2004 to 2006, McClendon bought almost  of mostly undeveloped dunes on the east coast of Lake Michigan and the Kalamazoo River for $39.5 million. He had previously secured a half-interest on the land in 2004. In 2006, the five-member Township Board representing Saugatuck, Michigan voted unanimously to rezone the land, making development more difficult. The Township Board supported the views of local citizens and the Saugatuck Dunes Coastal Alliance, who argued that McClendon's plans for development would irrevocably damage the property. He continued with the land purchase, and in 2007, his legal team began discussions of scaling back the legal restrictions on the land with township officials.

In 2009, McClendon sold  of the land to the Western Michigan Land Conservancy. In December 2010, McClendon filed a federal lawsuit attempting to overturn the zoning laws and a settlement was reached in 2012 which voided Saugatuck's 2006 rezoning.

Oklahoma City Thunder

McClendon was an original member of the Professional Basketball Club LLC, which owns the National Basketball Association (NBA)'s Oklahoma City Thunder franchise. He was a part of the team that moved the Seattle SuperSonics to Oklahoma City in 2008, where they were renamed the Oklahoma City Thunder. At the time the team moved, McClendon owned 20 percent of the franchise.

Prior to the move, in 2007, McClendon was quoted in The Journal Record (an Oklahoma City newspaper) as saying "we (the ownership group) didn't buy the Seattle SuperSonics to keep them in Seattle". The NBA fined McClendon $250,000 in response, as his statement contradicted the organization's publicized intentions at the time. In April 2014, he purchased more shares in the Oklahoma City Thunder franchise from G. Jeffrey Records Jr.

Philanthropy and community involvement
McClendon made sizable donations to and served on the board of directors for many municipal and private organizations in Oklahoma City, including the Boathouse District and Boathouse Foundation, The McClendon Family Boys and Girls Club of OKC, the Oklahoma City Chamber of Commerce, Oklahoma State Fair and Oklahoma City Public Schools. He donated to Oklahoma City arts organizations, including the Lyric Theatre, Oklahoma City Ballet, Oklahoma Museum of Art, Arts Council of Oklahoma City, the Oklahoma Heritage Foundation and the Oklahoma City Philharmonic.

From 2011 on, McClendon hosted an annual event for local Boy Scouts at his Arcadia Farm property. He donated approximately $15 million to Duke University and $12.5 million to the University of Oklahoma.

Honors and awards
McClendon was inducted into the Oklahoma Heritage Foundation's Oklahoma Hall of Fame in 2007, and in 2009, he was a top finalist for CEO of the Year at the Platts Global Energy Awards.

In 2010, U.S. Steel Tubular Products, Inc., a subsidiary of United States Steel Corporation, gave McClendon the Chief Roughneck Award, which honors the lifetime achievements of petroleum industry leaders.

In 2011, he was awarded the Ernst & Young National Entrepreneur of the Year in Energy, Cleantech and Natural Resources. In 2013, the Heritage Hall Alumni Association named McClendon, who graduated in 1977, the recipient of its Distinguished Alumni Award.

Personal life and interests
McClendon lived in Oklahoma City with his wife, the former Kathleen Upton Byrns. They have three adult children named Jack, Callie, and Will. By his wife, he was related to Sports Illustrated supermodel Kate Upton.

McClendon's personal wine collection was estimated at one time to include more than 100,000 bottles. He also held an extensive collection of antique maps of Oklahoma and had collected a number of vintage motor boats.

McClendon, an Episcopalian, would sometimes quote scripture in workplace emails. He also employed chaplains while heading Chesapeake.

McClendon was a known associate of, and contributed funding to, convicted fraudster Billy McFarland.   Co-founder of the ill-fated Fyre Festival.

Death
McClendon died in a solo-occupant, single-vehicle crash at 9:12 a.m. on March 2, 2016. According to police reports, he died instantly when his 2013 Chevrolet Tahoe SUV traveled at 88 mph and crashed into a concrete overpass for the Turner Turnpike on Midwest Boulevard in Oklahoma City. 

McClendon's body was badly burned, making identification difficult. A forensic odontologist was brought in, and positively identified McClendon by his teeth on March 4, 2016. The medical examiner's office reported McClendon died from multiple blunt force trauma. On March 3, 2016, less than 48 hours after McClendon was charged, the Justice Department filed motions and dismissed McClendon's indictment. On June 8, 2016, the Oklahoma medical examiner officially ruled the crash which killed shale pioneer McClendon was an accident. According to the autopsy report, no alcohol was involved in the accident, but an unspecified amount of the over the counter first-generation antihistamine and short-term sedative drug Doxylamine (which is used as an antihistamine or to treat insomnia) was found in Mr. McClendon's system.

Background
The event occurred one day after McClendon's indictment by a federal grand jury accusing him of violating antitrust laws from 2007 to 2012 while the CEO of Chesapeake Energy. A spokesman for the U.S. Attorney in Oklahoma City disputed initial reports that McClendon was en route to the courthouse when the crash occurred. The spokesman said no arraignments or meetings were scheduled with McClendon on the day of his car accident.

Discussion and investigation
Oklahoma City Police spokesman Paco Balderrama said of McClendon's actions, "He pretty much drove straight into the wall. The information out there at the scene is that he went left of center, went through a grassy area right before colliding into the embankment. There was plenty of opportunity for him to correct and get back on the roadway, and that didn't occur." On June 9 the medical examiner classified the death as an accident.

On the day of the incident, local police indicated that it was too early to determine if the collision was intentional or if McClendon may have suffered a medical emergency. He was not wearing a seat belt at the time of the crash but this was not unusual. Two months later, with the medical examiner's final report still pending, Balderrama announced that the police investigation found no evidence of suicide, including no emails or messages implying this, but neither could it be ruled out: "Had he slept at all? It's very possible he suffered a medical event... We may never know one-hundred percent what happened."

The medical examiner classified the death as an accident.

McClendon was regarded as an optimistic person, with an appetite for risk beyond most people's comfort level, by several people who knew him well.

References

External links
American Energy Partners
Federal indictment for violating antitrust laws (2016)

American energy industry executives
Businesspeople from Oklahoma City
1959 births
2016 deaths
American chief executives
American billionaires
Duke University Trinity College of Arts and Sciences alumni
Oklahoma City Thunder owners
Road incident deaths in Oklahoma
20th-century American businesspeople
21st-century American businesspeople
20th-century American Episcopalians